Kalleh Siran (also Romanized as Kalleh Sīrān and Koleh Sīrān; also known as Kaleh Sarān, Kalekh Seran, Koleh Sarān, Qal‘eh Saran, and Qal‘eh Seran) is a village in Chavarzaq Rural District, Chavarzaq District, Tarom County, Zanjan Province, Iran. At the 2006 census, its population was 123, in 32 families.

References 

Populated places in Tarom County